Faamausili or Fa'amausili is a Samoan surname. Notable people with the surname include:

Gabrielle Fa'amausili (born 1999), New Zealand swimmer
Orinoco Faamausili-Banse (born 1990), New Zealand swimmer
Poasa Faamausili (born 1996), New Zealand rugby league player

Samoan-language surnames